Bill Allen (born 1945) is an American former basketball player who played one season in the American Basketball Association (ABA).

Allen played collegiately for New Mexico State University.  In the 1967–68 season, he played 38 games in the American Basketball Association for the Anaheim Amigos.

References 

1945 births
Living people
American men's basketball players
Anaheim Amigos players
Centers (basketball)
New Mexico State Aggies men's basketball players
Power forwards (basketball)